Macon is an unincorporated community in Franklin County, Texas, United States.

History
It is unknown when the community was first settled, but Macon was not founded until the 1880s. A post office was established at Macon in 1891 and remained in operation until 1906. The community had a store, a sawmill, a cotton gin, a blacksmith shop, and 25 residents in 1896. It became a gathering place for farmers. Macon had a population of 75 that was served by two churches, a store, and a cemetery in the 1930s. It began to decline after World War II and only had the cemetery, church, and several scattered houses remaining by 1985.

Geography

Education
Macon had its own school in the 1930s. Today, the community is served by the Mount Vernon Independent School District.

References

Unincorporated communities in Franklin County, Texas
Unincorporated communities in Texas